Waterloo High School is a high school in Waterloo, Illinois, and is the only public high school in the Waterloo area.

Campus
In 2007, ground was broken on a new building. The school's cost is roughly $38 million. The school has a total of 57 classrooms.

Waterloo High School has an auditorium that can hold 462 people. The school also has a fitness center and weight room used for PE students and athletes, four computer labs, a library, a cafeteria that can seat 600 students, band room, chorus room, and an engineering lab. The school has an interior courtyard area for agricultural classes.

Sports
The school has a  gym that holds a total of 2,000 people. The school has six tennis courts, one softball field, one baseball field, and a football/soccer field as well as the marching field and a track.

Extracurricular activities
Waterloo High School offers a large number of extracurricular activities.

Art Club
Auto Club
Band
Chess Club
Chorus
Diversity Club
Drama Club
FFA
FCA
Gaming Club
German Club
FCCLA (Family, Career, and Community Leaders of America)
Fortnite Team
Friends for Friends
Lifesavers
Math Team
NHS (National Honors Society)
Orange Crush (Pep Club)
Renaissance
Saturday Scholars
Science Club
Spanish Club
Speech Team
Scholar Bowl
SHOW (Students Helping Out Waterloo)
Student Council
Wahischo (Yearbook Committee)
WYSE

Notable alumni
David Meckler (born 1987), ice hockey player

References

External links
 Waterloo High School website

Education in the Metro East
Public high schools in Illinois
Waterloo, Illinois
Schools in Monroe County, Illinois